The North Yemen Cup of the Republic was an association football competition run by the Yemen Football Association (YFA). It was played between 1977 until 1984.

Finals

External links 
 North Yemen Cup of the Republic results RSSSF

 

Defunct football cup competitions in Yemen